Ravikumar is Hindu given name, which means "Son of the Sun", combining the Sanskrit words "Ravi" (Sun) and "Kumar" (Son). The name may refer to:
Ravikumar (actor) (born 1953), Indian actor
Ravikumar (writer) (born 1961), Indian writer
Ravikumar Samarth (born 1993), Indian cricketer 
Ravikumar Thakur (born 1984), Indian cricketer
Ravikumar R., Indian director
Ravikumar TS writer born 1964

See also
Ravi (disambiguation)
Ravi Kumar (disambiguation)

Given names
Indian given names